The Wainwright Roaming Buffalo Classic was an annual bonspiel, or curling tournament, that took place at the Wainwright Curling Club in Wainwright, Alberta. The tournament was held in a triple-knockout format. The tournament, started in 1998 as part of the World Curling Tour, was held every year since with the exception of 2001, until 2012. Curlers from Alberta dominated the event.

Past champions
Only skip's name is displayed.

References

External links
Home Page
Wainwright Curling Club Home

Former World Curling Tour events
Curling in Alberta